Andrew Housser is a entrepreneur who co-founded Freedom Financial Network, and the founder of Bills.com.

Education 
Housser attended Brentwood College School in Mill Bay, Canada. Housser received his MBA from Stanford Business School, where he was an Arjay Miller Scholar, and received a BA from Dartmouth College, where he graduated summa cum laude, and was a member of the Phi Beta Kappa honor society. Housser is on the Board of Advisors of the Magnuson Center for Entrepreneurship at Dartmouth College, serves on the board of Brentwood College School, and previously served on the Phillips Brooks School board for six years. He also speaks regularly to entrepreneurship classes at Stanford Business School on topics including formation of new ventures and managing growing enterprises.

Career 
Prior to founding Freedom Financial Network, Housser was an investor in a variety of services, manufacturing, and distribution companies at Littlejohn & Company, a private equity firm based in Greenwich, Connecticut. Prior to Littlejohn & Company, he worked for Smith Barney in New York City in the company's investment banking division.

Housser and his business partner, Brad Stroh, founded Freedom Financial Network in 2002. Housser serves on the American Fair Credit Council's (AFCC) board of directors, a position he has held since 2006, when it operated under the name The Association of Settlement Companies. In 2010, he was awarded the association's President's Award for outstanding voluntary service to the organization and contributions that "benefits the consumer".

In 2005, Stroh and Housser purchased the Bills.com domain and relaunched it as a website that provides consumers with information and interactive tools dealing with personal finance topics including debt relief assistance, mortgage loans, and insurance. In 2008, Entrepreneur magazine named Bills.com No. 3 in the Hot 100 Fastest Growing Companies in America.

In December 2013, Freedom Financial Network announced that Vulcan Capital, an investment group owned by Microsoft co-founder Paul Allen, would invest $125million of venture capital in FreedomPlus, an online lending platform to make unsecured loans to consumers. Housser is CEO of FreedomPlus.

In 2015, Stone Point Capital, a private equity firm based in Greenwich, CT purchased a minority stake in Freedom.

In 2016, Freedom Financial Network and Stone Point Capital founded the Freedom Consumer Credit Fund LLC (FCCF), which funds the Freedom Financial Asset Management (FFAM) subsidiary of Freedom Financial Network. FFAM offers personal loan products to consumers to consolidate their debts, lower interest rates and convert revolving debt into fixed-amortizing installment loans. FFAM provides long-term risk-adjusted returns for investors in consumer lending.

In 2019, Freedom Financial Network announced the launch of Lendage, its home mortgage business, founded to enable people to tap into their home value to consolidate debt, and start building a solid foundation for the future.

In 2021, Freedom Financial Network announced that it had surpassed more than $15 billion in debt settlement on behalf of over one million customers.

Awards 
Winner of 2008 Ernst & Young Entrepreneurs of the Year for the Northern California region.
Named to the Silicon Valley/San Jose Business Journal's "40 Under 40" list.
Freedom Financial Network was named Best Places to Work in the San Francisco Bay area: 2008, 2009, 2012, 2013, 2014.
Freedom Financial Network was named Best Places to Work in the Phoenix area: 2008, 2009, 2010, 2012, 2013, 2014, 2015, 2016, 2017, 2018.
In 2016, 2017 and 2021, Freedom Financial Network was ranked No. 1 among Extra-Large Employers.

Personal life 
Housser lives with his family in Northern California.  He is married to Lara Bridges Housser and the father of three children.

References

Talks 
State of the School 2018
Andrew Housser on How to Run a Successful Business with Heart

21st-century American businesspeople
Businesspeople from Vancouver
Silicon Valley people
Stanford University alumni
Stanford Graduate School of Business alumni
1973 births
Living people